The Bunker Hill Historic District is the center of the town of Bunker Hill, West Virginia. Today located on the road called US 11, the town was developed along the Martinsburg, West Virginia - Winchester, Virginia road. Bunker Hill served southern Berkeley County with three stores, six mills, and five churches. It was also home to a significant African-American population.

Much of the land around Bunker Hill belonged to General Elisha Boyd, who built what amounted to an industrial village, with two mills, a brick-making operation, a cooperage, and a store on part of his Edgewood Manor plantation. After General Boyd's death in 1841 his son John tried to develop the area as a town, selling some lots and building another store and a log house. The most southern lots in the town were sold to African Americans, and represent an example of a segregated community in the post-Civil War period, becoming known as "Black Row."

Significant contributing buildings include:

Boyd's Store: A brick pre-Civil War house.
Jesse Brilhart Store: Built circa 1852 and operating as a store into the 1980s. It retains its interior furnishings.
North Music School: A two-story stone building.
Boyd House: A two-story building resembling the Bunker Hill Store.
Bunker Hill Methodist Church: A Gothic Revival church built in 1912.
The Parsonage: Late Victorian Gothic in style, with some surviving trim details
Mount Tabor Baptist Church: A one-story frame building, located on "Black Row."
New Presbyterian Church: Originally built in 1854, it was heavily damaged in the Civil War. It was rebuilt in 1879 in the Romanesque Revival style.

The district was listed on the National Register of Historic Places in 1980.

References

External links
Bunker Hill Mill, County Route 26, Bunker Hill vicinity, Berkeley, WV at the Historic American Engineering Record (HAER)

American Civil War sites in West Virginia
Berkeley County, West Virginia, in the American Civil War
Commercial buildings on the National Register of Historic Places in West Virginia
Gothic Revival architecture in West Virginia
Greek Revival architecture in West Virginia
Historic districts in Berkeley County, West Virginia
Houses on the National Register of Historic Places in West Virginia
Churches on the National Register of Historic Places in West Virginia
Romanesque Revival architecture in West Virginia
Stick-Eastlake architecture in West Virginia
Vernacular architecture in West Virginia
Historic American Engineering Record in West Virginia
Houses in Berkeley County, West Virginia
Historic districts on the National Register of Historic Places in West Virginia
National Register of Historic Places in Berkeley County, West Virginia